Levy Mwanawasa Medical University (LMMU), is a public university in Lusaka, Zambia. It is the country’s first ever specialized University for health studies.

Location
The main campus of the university is located on Chainama Hill, 
in northeastern Lusaka, the capital and largest city of Zambia. The geographical coordinates of the university campus are: 15°23'06.0"S, 28°21'14.0"E (Latitude:-15.385000; Longitude:28.353889).

Overview
The Levy Mwanawasa Medical University School of Medicine and Clinical Sciences, comprises the Chainama College of Health Sciences, the Dental Training School, Levy Mwanawasa University Teaching Hospital and Chainama Hills Hospital. Those public institutions, which were operating independent of each other, were integrated into one teaching institution, the School of Medicine of LMMU.

The schools and institutes that make up the university, include the following, as of August 2020: 1. Institute of Basic and Biomedical Sciences 2. School of Nursing 3. School of Health Sciences 4. School of Medicine and Clinical Sciences and 5. School of Public Health and Environmental Sciences.

History
In 2016, the government of Zambia began the expansion of Levy Mwanawasa Teaching Hospital to 850 bed capacity. At the same time, construction started on a training annex, with student capacity of 3,000 adjacent to the hospital. The work was funded by the Zambian government to the tune of ZMW:170 million (approx. US$10 million). Sanjin Construction Engineering Group Company Limited were the main contractors. This formed the nucleus of Levy Mwanawasa Medical University.

Academic programmes 
As of August 2020, the following degree courses were offered at the university:

School of Medicine and Clinical Sciences
Undergraduate degree courses:

 Bachelor of Medicine and Bachelor of Surgery
 Bachelor of Science in Clinical Sciences
 Bachelor of Science in Clinical Anaesthesia
 Bachelor of Science in Clinical Ophthalmology
 Bachelor of Science in Optometry
 Bachelor of Science in Mental Health and Clinical Psychiatry

School of Nursing
Undergraduate degree courses:

 Bachelor of Science in Nursing
 Bachelor of Science in Ophthalmic Nursing
 Bachelor of Science in Midwifery
 Bachelor of Science in Public Health Nursing
 Bachelor of Science in Mental Health Nursing

Institute of Basic and Biomedical Sciences
Courses offered:

 Diploma in General Counselling
 Bachelor of Arts in Counselling
 Post Graduate Diploma in Medical Education
 Master of Science in Health Professions’ Education
 Doctor of Philosophy in Health Professions’ Education

School Of Health Sciences
Degree courses offered:

 Bachelor of Science in Nutrition and Dietetics
 Bachelor of Science in Biomedical Sciences
 Bachelor of pharmacy (Bpharm)
 Bachelor of science in radiography 
 Bachelor of science in physiotherapy

School of Public Health and Environmental Sciences
The following courses are offered:

 Master of Public Health
 Bachelor of Science in Public Health
 Bachelor of Science in Environmental Health
 Bachelor of Science in Public Health Nutrition
 Diploma in Public Health
 Diploma in Environmental Health Sciences

Other academic courses
In addition to the courses listed above, the university offers other diploma and certificate courses in its schools and institutes.

See also
 List of universities in Zambia

References

External links
 Official Website

 
Universities in Zambia
Lusaka
Educational institutions established in 2019
2019 establishments in Zambia
Universities and colleges in Africa
Buildings and structures in Lusaka Province
Medical education